Laßnitz bei Murau is a former municipality in the district of Murau in Styria, Austria. Since the 2015 Styria municipal structural reform, it is part of the municipality Murau.

Geography
Laßnitz lies between Murau and Sankt Lambrecht.

References

Cities and towns in Murau District